Holy Trinity Church, Bradford-on-Avon is a Grade I listed church in Bradford-on-Avon, Wiltshire, England. It is part of the Church of England within the Anglican Communion and Diocese of Salisbury. The parish of Holy Trinity has been a part of the benefice of Bradford on Avon Holy Trinity, Westwood and Wingfield since 2013.

History
The present church was built around 1150 and originally consisted of a chancel and nave. The chancel was lengthened around the beginning of the 13th century, and a section of the south east wall rebuilt in 1707. In 2016 the sale of a Flemish masterpiece by Quentin Matsys funded a £2m refurbishment of the church. A squint near the altar is claimed to be England's longest. The tower with spire was built around 1480, replacing an older one, and the south wall was largely rebuilt in the 19th century. The church has a ring of eight bells, with the tenor (heaviest bell) weighing .

Leadership
 the rector is The Reverend Canon Joanna Margaret Abecassis, who previously completed a PhD in agricultural landownership at the University of Cambridge. Abecassis took over as priest in charge in 2010 when her predecessor William Andrew Matthews retired. She has served as rector since 2013.

Previous leaders include:

 1981–2010 William Andrew Matthews, Chaplain to the Queen
 1973-1981 David Caldwell Ritche
 1965–1973 David Inderwick Strangeways
 1956–1965 Arthur Frederick Osborne
 1944–1956 Claude Stanley Green
 1937–1944 Philip Maurice Barry

References

Grade I listed churches in Wiltshire
Church of England church buildings in Wiltshire
12th-century church buildings in England 
Holy Trinity